The 2019–20 Illinois Fighting Illini women's basketball team represented the University of Illinois during the 2019–20 NCAA Division I women's basketball season. The Fighting Illini, led by third-year head coach Nancy Fahey, played their home games at State Farm Center as members of the Big Ten Conference. They finished the season 11–19, 2–16 in Big Ten play to finish in thirteenth place. They lost in the first round of the Big Ten women's tournament to Wisconsin.

Previous season

The Illini finished the season 10–20, 2–16 in Big Ten play to finish in last place. They lost in the first round of the Big Ten women's tournament to Purdue.

Roster

Schedule and results

Source:

|-
!colspan="9" style=| Non-conference regular season

|-
!colspan="9" style=| Big Ten conference season

|-
!colspan="9" style=| Big Ten Women's Tournament

Rankings

See also
2019–20 Illinois Fighting Illini men's basketball team

References

Illinois Fighting Illini women's basketball seasons
Illinois
Fight
Fight